La Cathédrale  (The Cathedral) is a 2006 film directed by Harrikrisna Anenden.

Synopsis 
A day in the life of Lina, a young girl from Port-Louis, capital of Mauritius, seen through the eyes of the cathedral. A day that will not be the same as the rest when an unexpected meeting brings Lina face to face with reality and she is forced her to make a choice.

Awards 
 CamboFest - 2007

References

External links
 

2006 films
Mauritian drama films